Sun Tongxuan (孙桐萱; Sun Tung-hsuan; 1895–1978) was a Kuomintang general. He fought at the Battles of Wuhan and south Henan.

References

External links
Lieutenant General Sun Tongxuan

National Revolutionary Army generals
1895 births
1978 deaths